Ernest Hayes may refer to:

 Ernie Hayes (1876–1953), English cricketer
 Ernest Hayes (British Army soldier) (1898–1938)
 Ernest Hayes (engineer) (1851–1933), New Zealand engineer and inventor
 Ernest Hayes (priest), Dean of Brechin
 Ernesto Hayes, Argentine footballer